This Day is a Nigerian newspaper.

This Day may also refer to:
This Day (South Africa), defunct South African newspaper and sister publication to the Nigerian newspaper
"This Day" (song), by Emma's Imagination, 2010
"This Day", a song by Audio Adrenaline from Underdog, 1999
"This Day", a song by Emil Bulls from Porcelain, 2003
365 Days: This Day, 2022 Polish film